The Montreat Cavaliers are the athletic teams that represent Montreat College, located in Montreat, North Carolina, in intercollegiate sports as a member of the National Association of Intercollegiate Athletics (NAIA), primarily competing in the Appalachian Athletic Conference (AAC) since the 2001–02 academic year. They were also a member of the National Christian College Athletic Association (NCCAA), primarily competing as an independent in the South Region of the Division II level.

Varsity teams
Montreat competes in 22 intercollegiate varsity sports: Men's sports include baseball, basketball, cross country, golf, lacrosse, soccer, tennis, track & field and wrestling; while women's sports include basketball, cross country, golf, lacrosse, soccer, softball, tennis, track & field, volleyball and wrestling; and co-ed sports include competitive cheer, competitive dance and clay target shooting.

References

External links
 

College sports teams in the United States by team
 
Appalachian Athletic Conference teams
National Association of Intercollegiate Athletics teams
College sports teams in North Carolina